The Encyclopaedia Aethiopica (EAe) is a basic English-language encyclopaedia for Ethiopian and Eritrean studies. The Encyclopaedia Aethiopica provides information in all fields of the discipline, i.e. anthropology, archaeology, ethnology, history, geography, languages and literatures, art, religion, culture and basic data. Although the main audience is academic, most articles are readable also for non-specialists. The EAe is illustrated with maps and photographs. It employs an in-house form of romanization of Geez, Amharic, and other languages, which varies greatly from standard formats, such as BGN/PCGN: the emperor Menelek II's name, for example, is written as "Mənilək II".

Authorship and structure
The Encyclopaedia Aethiopica has hundreds of authors from at least thirty countries. High academic standards are secured by an editorial team based at the Research Unit Ethiopian Studies (since 2009 Hiob Ludolf Centre for Ethiopian Studies) at the University of Hamburg in Germany, and experts on all important fields and a board of international supervisors supported the editors. Editor-in-chief is Prof. Dr. Siegbert Uhlig, former holder of the chair of Ethiopian Studies at the Asia-Africa Institute of Hamburg University, and (since 2009) his successor Prof. Dr. Alessandro Bausi. At a presentation of the Encyclopaedia in Rome, Bausi described some of the process of producing this set of volumes.

The series consists of five volumes (published in 2003, 2005, 2007, 2010, 2014). The first volume includes letters A-C, the second volume is dedicated to letters D-Ha, the third volume covers He-N, the fourth volume has the terms starting with the letters O through X, and the final volume has the terms for letters Y-Z, including a comprehensive index, supplementary articles, and additional maps and material.

The EAe is funded by the Deutsche Forschungsgemeinschaft, the Zeit-Stiftung Ebelin und Gerd Bucerius, the Fritz Thyssen Foundation, the German Israeli Foundation, the Johanna und Fritz Buch Gedächtnis-Stiftung, the Karl H. Ditze Stiftung, the Sigrid Rausing Trust and the University of Hamburg.

Critical reception
In 2010, following the 2007 publication of volume 3 of EAe, Paolo Marrassini described the EAe as being "confidently classified as the most important systematic work in the field of Ethiopian studies ever undertaken."

References

Relevant Literature
 Siegbert Uhlig, et al. (eds.) (2003). Encyclopaedia Aethiopica, Vol. 1: A-C. Wiesbaden: Harrassowitz Verlag.
 Siegbert Uhlig, et al. (eds.) (2005). Encyclopaedia Aethiopica, Vol. 2: D-Ha. Wiesbaden: Harrassowitz Verlag.
 Siegbert Uhlig, et al. (eds.) (2007). Encyclopaedia Aethiopica, Vol. 3: He-N. Wiesbaden: Harrassowitz Verlag.
 Siegbert Uhlig in cooperation with Alessandro Bausi, et al. (eds.) (2010). Encyclopaedia Aethiopica, Vol. 4: O-X. Wiesbaden: Harrassowitz Verlag.
Alessandro Bausi in cooperation with Siegbert Uhlig, et al. (eds.) (2014). Encyclopaedia Aethiopica, Vol. 5: Y-Z, Supplementa, Addenda et Corrigenda, Maps, Index. Wiesbaden: Harrassowitz Verlag.

Reviews
 Hussein Ahmed "Ethiopian Muslims and Islam: A Review Article" in Journal of Ethiopian Studies, vol. XXXVII, no. 2, Addis Ababa 2004, pp. 165–175.
 Hatem Elliesie "Der zweite Band der Encyclopaedia Aethiopica im Vergleich" in: OLZ (Orientalistische Literaturzeitung), vol. 102, issue 4-5, Berlin 2007, pp. 397–407.
 Manfred Kropp "Besprechung der Encyclopaedia Aethiopica vol. 1 und vol. 2" in Oriens Christianus 91, 2007, pp.  250-256.
 Manfred Kropp "Besprechung der Encyclopaedia Aethiopica vol. 3" in Oriens Christanus 93, 2009, pp.  286-288.
 Tatiana Kryuchkova / Victor Porkhomovsky: Encyclopaedia Aethiopica Volume 1. A-C." in  ZDMG (Zeitschrift der Deutschen Morgenländischen Gesellschaft), vol. 156, Wiesbaden 2006, pp. 461–462.
 Joseph Tubiana "Encyclopaedia Aethiopica vol. I" in: Aethiopica (International Journal of Ethiopian and Eritrean Studies), vol. 7, Wiesbaden 2004, pp. 194–211.

External links
 Encyclopaedia Aethiopica
 Encyclopaedia Aethiopica: A-C
 Encyclopaedia Aethiopica: D-Ha
 Encyclopaedia Aethiopica: He-N
 Encyclopaedia Aethiopica Transliteration/Transcription

English-language encyclopedias
Ethiopian culture
Ethiopian studies
Eritrean culture
Eritrean studies
National encyclopedias
German encyclopedias
African encyclopedias
21st-century encyclopedias
Area studies encyclopedias
Harrassowitz Verlag books